Druminargal is a townland of 389 acres in County Armagh, Northern Ireland. It is situated in the civil parish of Ballymore and the historic barony of Orior Lower, near Poyntzpass.

People
Rear Admiral Charles Davis Lucas (1834-1914), from Druminargal House, was a Royal Navy officer and recipient of the Victoria Cross.

See also
List of townlands in County Armagh

References

Townlands of County Armagh
Civil parish of Ballymore, County Armagh